Zhou Zuyi (born January 1965) is a Chinese politician who is the current Communist Party Secretary of Fujian and previously served as Minister of Human Resources and Social Security. He is a member of the 20th Central Committee of the Chinese Communist Party.

He was a member of the Standing Committee of the 13th Chinese People's Political Consultative Conference and a representative of the 19th and the 20th National Congress of the Chinese Communist Party.

Early life and education
Zhou was born in Tiantai County, Zhejiang, in January 1965. He attended Zhejiang University, graduating in 1984 with a Bachelor of Science. He went on to receive his Doctor of Science in 1989 at Tongji University. He was a visiting scholar at the Royal Society of the University of Wales from March 1993 to March 1994 and a visiting professor at ETH Zurich from October 1997 to October 1998.

Career at Tongji University
He joined the Chinese Communist Party (CCP) in June 1984. After graduating in 1989, he stayed at Tongji University and worked successively as associate professor, associate director, researcher, and party secretary of the School of Science. He was appointed deputy party secretary of Tongji University in July 2002, concurrently serving as vice president since December 2004. He was deputy head of Organization Department of Shanghai Municipal Committee of the Chinese Communist Party in November 2008, and held that office until November 2011. In November 2011, he was promoted to become party secretary of Tongji University, a position at vice-ministerial level.

Career in the Central Government
In August 2014, he entered the Organization Department of the Chinese Communist Party and was elevated to deputy head in October 2016. He was chosen as chief of the General Office of the Central Institutional Organization Commission in May 2019, a position he held until June 2022, when he promoted again to become minister of human resources and social security.

Career in Fujian
On November 13, 2022, Zhou was appointed as the Communist Party Secretary of Fujian. At the time of his appointment, he was the youngest party secretary of the Chinese Communist Party's provincial party committees, and the first party secretary to be born in or after 1965.

References

1965 births
Living people
People from Tiantai County
Zhejiang University alumni
Tongji University alumni
Academic staff of Tongji University
People's Republic of China politicians from Zhejiang
Chinese Communist Party politicians from Zhejiang
Members of the Standing Committee of the 13th Chinese People's Political Consultative Conference